Laura Alfaro is an economist, currently the Warren Alpert Professor of Business Administration at Harvard Business School. Her specific areas of interest focus on capital markets, economics, foreign direct investment, globalization, and international finance. From 2010 to 2012, she served as Minister of National Planning and Economic Policy in the Government of Costa Rica. She holds a PhD in economics from the University of California, Los Angeles and a Bachelor of Arts in economics from the University of Costa Rica. At Harvard, Alfaro has taught in the General Management Program, the Program for Leadership and Development, and in the MBA and doctoral programs. 

Along with being named Warren Alpert Professor of Business Administration in 2013, Alfaro was also the recipient of a 2016 Lemann Brazil Research Fund Award from Harvard University and in 2018 she was the recipient of a Harvard China Fund Faculty Grant.

Alfaro has many published works, with her work mostly focusing on global markets and finance, supply and demand shocks, and current events that could be connected to her topics of focus. Some of her works include "Pandemics Fragilities: Halt in Hyper specialized GVC and the Big- Dollar- Hunger."and "On the Direct and Indirect Real Effects of Credit Supply Shocks." These articles were published in highly-credited academic journals such as the American Economic Review, Review of Economic Studies, the Journal of Political Economy, and the Journal of International Economics.

References

Year of birth missing (living people)
Living people
Harvard Business School faculty
American economists
American women economists
University of California, Los Angeles alumni
21st-century American women